Sir John Guildford (1430–1493) (alias Guilford, Guldeford, etc.) of Halden in the  parish of Rolvenden, Kent,  was Comptroller of the Household to Edward IV.

Origin
His grandmother was Joan Halden, daughter and heiress of John Halden of Halden in Rolvenden.

Marriages
He married firstly Alice Waller, by whom he had progeny including:
Sir Richard Guildford (c. 1450 – 1506), KG, a courtier who held important positions at the court of King Henry VII, including the office of Master of the Ordnance.

Licenses to crenellate
In 1487 he obtained royal licenses to crenellate at Brockley in Cranbrook, Halden in Rolvenden, Hawridge in Ebney, and Tenterden.

See also
Guldeford baronets

References

1493 deaths
1430 births
English knights
People from the Borough of Ashford